Julio Gallardo (June 26, 1958February 9, 2011) was a Mexican-American basketball player. He represented Mexico at the 1983 Pan American Games, held at Caracas, Venezuela.

Early life
Gallardo was born in El Paso, Texas to Mexican parents.

Professional basketball career
Gallardo played for a local, Hermosillo professional basketball team from 1976 to 1982. In 1984, he joined the Baloncesto Superior Nacional Mayaguez Tainos in Mayaguez, Puerto Rico, becoming an all star in that league. He played with the Tainos until 1989, when they had moved to the Southwestern Puerto Rico city of Cabo Rojo.

Personal
Gallardo was the son of David and Maria Estela Gallardo. He studied at Ysleta High School, where he played basketball.

References

1958 births
2011 deaths
Basketball players at the 1983 Pan American Games
Baylor Bears men's basketball players
Junior college men's basketball players in the United States
American men's basketball players
Mexican men's basketball players
Basketball players from Chihuahua
Baloncesto Superior Nacional players
Pan American Games medalists in basketball
Pan American Games bronze medalists for Mexico
American sportspeople of Mexican descent
Basketball players from El Paso, Texas
Medalists at the 1983 Pan American Games